Gunnar Göransson (14 July 1933 – 22 April 2012) was a Swedish cyclist. He competed  at the 1956 and 1960 Summer Olympics.

References

External links
 

1933 births
2012 deaths
Swedish male cyclists
Olympic cyclists of Sweden
Cyclists at the 1956 Summer Olympics
Cyclists at the 1960 Summer Olympics
Sportspeople from Norrköping
20th-century Swedish people
21st-century Swedish people